Ugandolaelaps is a genus of mites in the family Laelapidae.

Species
 Ugandolaelaps protoxera Radford, 1942

References

Laelapidae